Clifford Parker Robertson III (September 9, 1923 – September 10, 2011) was an American actor whose career in film and television spanned over six decades. Robertson portrayed a young John F. Kennedy in the 1963 film PT 109, and won the 1968 Academy Award for Best Actor for his role in the film Charly.

On television, Robertson portrayed retired astronaut Buzz Aldrin in the 1976 TV film adaptation of Aldrin's autobiographic Return to Earth, played a fictional character based on Director of Central Intelligence Richard Helms in the 1977 miniseries Washington: Behind Closed Doors, and portrayed Henry Ford in Ford: The Man and the Machine (1987). His last well-known film appearances were as Uncle Ben in the 2002–2007 Spider-Man film trilogy.

Robertson was also an accomplished aviator who served as the founding chairman of the Experimental Aircraft Association (EAA)'s Young Eagles Program during its inception in the early 1990s. It became the most successful aviation youth advocacy program in history.

Early life and education
Robertson was born in La Jolla, California, the son of Clifford Parker Robertson Jr. (1902–1968), and his first wife, Audrey Olga Robertson (née Willingham; 1903–1925).  His Texas-born father was described as "the idle heir to a tidy sum of ranching money". Robertson once said, "[My father] was a very romantic figure – tall, handsome. He married four or five times, and between marriages he'd pop in to see me. He was a great raconteur, and he was always surrounded by sycophants who let him pick up the tab. During the Great Depression, he tapped the trust for $500,000, and six months later he was back for more."

Robertson's parents divorced when he was one, and his mother died of peritonitis a year later in El Paso, Texas, at the age of 21. He was raised by his maternal grandmother, Mary Eleanor "Eleanora" Willingham (née Sawyer, 1875–1957), in California, and rarely saw his father. He graduated in 1941 from La Jolla High School, where he was known as "The Walking Phoenix".

He served as a third mate in the U.S. Merchant Marine during World War II, before attending Antioch College in Yellow Springs, Ohio, and dropping out to work for a short time as a journalist.

Career
Robertson studied at the Actors Studio, becoming a life member.  In the early 1950s he worked steadily in television, including a stint as the lead of Rod Brown of the Rocket Rangers (1953–1954). He appeared in Broadway in Late Love (1953–1954) and The Wisteria Tree (1955), the latter written by Joshua Logan.

Columbia
Robertson made his film debut in Picnic (1955), directed by Logan. Robertson played the role of William Holden's best friend – a part originated on stage by Paul Newman. Newman was under contract to Warner Bros when the film was being made and was then considered too big a star to reprise his stage performance. Logan's wife recommended Robertson after seeing him in a revival of Westeria Tree and the director remembered him from a Chicago production of Mister Roberts and so Robertson was cast.

The film was a box office success and Robertson was promoted to Joan Crawford's co star in Autumn Leaves (1956), also at Columbia Pictures, playing her mentally unstable younger lover. This meant he had to pass up the chance to replace Ben Gazzara on Broadway in Cat on a Hot Tin Roof. However he did return to Broadway to appear in Orpheus Descending by Tennessee Williams, which only had a short run.

Robertson went to RKO to make two films: The Naked and the Dead (1958), an adaptation of the famous novel, co-starring Aldo Ray; and The Girl Most Likely (1958), a musical – the last film made by RKO Studios.  Robertson received superb reviews for Days of Wine and Roses on TV with Piper Laurie.

He was in Columbia's Gidget (1959) appearing opposite Sandra Dee as the Big Kahuna. It was popular and led to two sequels, neither of which Robertson appeared in. Less successful was a war film at Columbia, Battle of the Coral Sea (1959).

Robertson had better luck on TV, appearing in "A Hundred Yards Over the Rim" and "The Dummy" for The Twilight Zone. He was the third lead in Paramount's All in a Night's Work (1961) and starred in Samuel Fuller's Underworld U.S.A. (1961) at Columbia. He also portrayed the villain Shame in Batman (1966).

Robertson supported Esther Williams in The Big Show (1961). He had his first film hit since Gidget with Columbia's The Interns (1962). After supporting Debbie Reynolds in My Six Loves (1963), Robertson was President John F. Kennedy's personal choice to play him in 1963's PT 109. The film was not a success at the box office.

More popular was Sunday in New York (1963), where Robertson supported Rod Taylor and Jane Fonda, and The Best Man where he was a ruthless presidential candidate.

Robertson appeared in a popular war film 633 Squadron (1964) then supported Lana Turner in a melodrama, Love Has Many Faces (1965). In 1965 he said his contract with Columbia was for one film a year.

Charly
In 1961 Robertson had played the lead role in a United States Steel Hour television production titled "The Two Worlds of Charlie Gordon", based on the novel Flowers for Algernon by Daniel Keyes. Frustrated at the progress of his career, Robertson optioned the rights to the teleplay and hired William Goldman to write a script. Before Goldman completed his work, Robertson arranged for Goldman to be hired to Americanize the dialogue for Masquerade (1965), a spy spoof which Robertson starred in, replacing Rex Harrison.

Robertson then made a war film, Up from the Beach (1965) for Fox and guest-starred on that studio's TV show, Batman (1966). He co-starred with Harrison in The Honey Pot (1967) for Joseph L. Mankiewicz then appeared in another war film, The Devil's Brigade (1968) with William Holden.

Robertson disliked Goldman's Algernon script and replaced the writer with Stirling Silliphant for what became Charly (1968). The film was another box office success and Robertson won the 1968 Academy Award for Best Actor for his portrayal of a mentally-challenged man.

Stardom
Charly was made by ABC Pictures, which insisted that Robert Aldrich use Robertson in Too Late the Hero (1970), a war film with Michael Caine that was a disappointment at the box office.

Robertson turned down roles in The Anderson Tapes, Straw Dogs (before Peckinpah was involved), and Dirty Harry. Instead Robertson co-wrote, starred in, and directed J. W. Coop (1972), another commercial disappointment despite excellent reviews.

Looking back on his career, Robertson said: "nobody made more mediocre movies than I did. Nobody ever did such a wide variety of mediocrity".

In 1969, immediately after winning the Academy Award for Charly, Robertson, a lifelong aviation enthusiast, attempted to produce and direct an aviation film, I Shot Down the Red Baron, I Think, featuring World War I aerial combat, using Lynn Garrison's Irish aviation facility. The comedic storyline portrayed the Red Baron as gay. The aircraft featured garish paint schemes. The film was never completed or released.

Robertson played Cole Younger in The Great Northfield Minnesota Raid (1972) and a pilot in Ace Eli and Rodger of the Skies (1973). He appeared in the 1974 thriller Man on a Swing and the 1975 British drama Out of Season.

Later career
Robertson returned to supporting parts in Three Days of the Condor (1975), which was a big hit. He played the lead in Obsession (1976), a popular thriller from Brian De Palma and Paul Schrader, and in the Canadian drama, Shoot (1976). He was also one of several stars in Midway (1976).

Robertson turned to television for Washington: Behind Closed Doors (1977), then had the lead in a thriller, Dominique (1978). He returned to directing for The Pilot (1980), also playing the title role, an alcoholic flyer. Robertson played Hugh Hefner in Star 80 (1980). He attempted to make Charly II in 1980 but it did not happen.

From the 1980s and 1990s onwards, Robertson was predominantly a character actor. He played villains in Class (1983) and Brainstorm (1983). He did have the lead in Shaker Run (1985) in New Zealand, and Dreams of Gold: The Mel Fisher Story (1986) on TV.

He was a villain in Malone (1987), did Dead Reckoning (1990) on TV and supported in Wild Hearts Can't Be Broken (1991), Wind (1991), Renaissance Man (1994) and John Carpenter's Escape from L.A. (1996).

Late in his life Robertson's career had a resurgence. He appeared as Uncle Ben Parker in Sam Raimi's Spider-Man (2002), as well as in the sequels Spider-Man 2 (2004) and Spider-Man 3 (2007; his last acting role). He commented on his website: "Since Spider-Man 1 and 2, I seem to have a whole new generation of fans. That in itself is a fine residual." He also starred in and wrote 13th Child (2002) and appeared in Riding the Bullet (2004), both horror films.

In 1989, he was a member of the jury at the 39th Berlin International Film Festival.

Television

Robertson's early television appearances included a starring role in the live space opera Rod Brown of the Rocket Rangers (1953–1954), as well as recurring roles on Hallmark Hall of Fame (1952), Alcoa Theatre (1959), and Playhouse 90 (1958, 1960), Outlaws (three episodes).  Robertson also appeared as a special guest star on Wagon Train for one episode, portraying an Irish immigrant.

In 1958, Robertson portrayed Joe Clay in the first broadcast of Playhouse 90'''s Days of Wine and Roses. In 1960, he was cast as Martinus Van Der Brig, a con man, in the episode "End of a Dream" of Riverboat.

Other appearances included, 1958 "Wagon Train", The Twilight Zone episodes "A Hundred Yards Over the Rim" (1961) and "The Dummy" (1962), followed by The Eleventh Hour in the 1963 episode, "The Man Who Came Home Late". He guest-starred on such television series as The Greatest Show on Earth, Breaking Point and ABC Stage 67. He had starring roles in episodes of both the 1960s and 1990s versions of The Outer Limits. He was awarded an Emmy for his leading role in a 1965 episode, "The Game" of Bob Hope Presents the Chrysler Theatre. He appeared twice as a guest-villain on ABC's Batman as the gunfighter "Shame" (1966 and 1968), the second time with his wife, Dina Merrill, as "Calamity Jan".

In 1976, he portrayed a retired Buzz Aldrin in an adaptation of Aldrin's autobiography Return to Earth. The next year, he portrayed a fictional Director of Central Intelligence (based on Richard Helms) in Washington: Behind Closed Doors, an adaptation of John Ehrlichman's roman à clef The Company, in turn based on the Watergate scandal. In 1987, he portrayed Henry Ford in Ford: The Man and The Machine. From 1983 to 1984, he played Dr. Michael Ranson in Falcon Crest.

Columbia Pictures scandal
In 1977, Robertson discovered that his signature had been forged on a $10,000 check payable to him, although it was for work he had not performed. He also learned that the forgery had been carried out by then-Columbia Pictures head David Begelman, and on reporting it he inadvertently triggered one of the biggest Hollywood scandals of the 1970s. Begelman was charged with embezzlement, convicted, and later fired from Columbia. Despite pressure to remain quiet, Robertson and his wife Dina Merrill spoke to the press. As a result, Hollywood producers blacklisted him.

He finally returned to studio film five years later, starring in Brainstorm (1983).McClintick, David. Indecent Exposure: A True Story of Hollywood and Wall Street, William Morrow and Company, 1982. The story of the scandal is told in David McClintick's 1982 bestseller Indecent Exposure.

Personal life
In 1957, Robertson married actress Cynthia Stone, the former wife of actor Jack Lemmon. They had a daughter, Stephanie, before divorcing in 1959; he also had a stepson by this marriage, Chris Lemmon. In 1966, he married actress and Post Cereals heiress Dina Merrill, the former wife of Stanley M. Rumbough Jr.; they had a daughter, Heather (1968–2007), before divorcing. By this marriage, he also had stepchildren Stanley Hutton Rumbough, David Post Rumbough, and Nedenia Colgate Rumbough. He resided in Water Mill, New York.

Robertson was a Democrat and supported Arizona congressman Morris K. Udall during the 1976 Democratic presidential primaries.

Aviation
A certified private pilot, one of Robertson's main hobbies was flying and, among other aircraft, he owned several de Havilland Tiger Moths, a Messerschmitt Bf 108, and a genuine World War II – era Mk.IX Supermarine Spitfire MK923.First Cross-Country Soaring or (You Ain't John Wayne – Robertson)  His first plane flight was in a Lockheed Model 9 Orion. As a 13-year-old he cleaned hangars for airplane rides. He met Paul Mantz, Art Scholl, and Charles Lindbergh while flying at local California airports. His piloting skills helped him get the part as the squadron leader in the British war film 633 Squadron. He entered balloon races, including one in 1964 from the mainland to Catalina Island that ended with him being rescued from the Pacific Ocean. He was also a glider pilot and owned a Grobe Astir.

In 1969, during the civil war conflict in Nigeria, Robertson helped organize an effort to fly food and medical supplies into the area. He also organized flights of supplies to the ravaged country of Ethiopia when it experienced famine in 1978. Within the EAA, he founded the Cliff Robertson Work Experience in 1993, which offers youths the chance to work for flight and ground school instruction.

Robertson was flying a private Beechcraft Baron over New York City on the morning of September 11, 2001, two days after his 78th birthday. He was directly above the World Trade Center climbing through 7,500 feet when the first Boeing 767 struck. He was instructed by air traffic control to land immediately at the nearest airport after a nationwide order to ground all civilian and commercial aircraft following the attacks.

Young Eagles
He was a longtime member of the Experimental Aircraft Association (EAA), working his way through the ranks in prominence and eventually co-founding the Young Eagles Program with EAA president Tom Poberezny. Robertson chaired the program from its 1992 inception to 1994 (succeeded by former test pilot Gen. Chuck Yeager). Along with educating youth about aviation, the initial goal of the Young Eagles was to fly one million children (many of them never having flown before) prior to the 100th Anniversary of Flight celebration on December 17, 2003. That goal was achieved on November 13, 2003. On July 28, 2016, the two millionth Young Eagle was flown by actor Harrison Ford.

Death
On September 10, 2011, one day after his 88th birthday, Robertson died of natural causes in Stony Brook, New York. His body was cremated, and a private funeral was held at St. Luke's Episcopal Church in East Hampton, New York and was interred at the Cedar Lawn Cemetery.

Filmography

 Awards 
Robertson was inducted into the National Aviation Hall of Fame in 2006. He received the Rebecca Rice Alumni Award from Antioch College in 2007. In addition to his Oscar and Emmy and several lifetime achievement awards from various film festivals, Robertson has a star on the Hollywood Walk of Fame at 6801 Hollywood Blvd. He was also awarded the 2008 Ambassador of Good Will Aviation Award by the National Transportation Safety Board (NTSB) Bar Association in Alexandria, Virginia, for his leadership in and promotion of general aviation. In 2009, Robertson was inducted into the International Air & Space Hall of Fame at the San Diego Air & Space Museum, and was part of the Living Legends of Aviation.

Notes

References

External links

 
 
 
 Interview in the Archive of American Television
 Bob Hope Presents the Chrysler Theatre'' episode 
 Warbird Registry entry on MK923
 "Cliff Robertson, 1923–2011: Actor, Writer, Producer and Director", a Special English presentation of Voice of America
 Biography in the National Aviation Hall of Fame

1923 births
2011 deaths
20th-century American Episcopalians
20th-century American male actors
21st-century American male actors
American aviators
American glider pilots
American male film actors
American male stage actors
American male television actors
American military personnel of World War II
American sailors
Antioch College alumni
Best Actor Academy Award winners
California Democrats
Experimental Aircraft Association
Male actors from San Diego
Military personnel from California
New York (state) Democrats
Outstanding Performance by a Lead Actor in a Miniseries or Movie Primetime Emmy Award winners
People from La Jolla, San Diego
People from Stony Brook, New York
United States Merchant Mariners
United States Merchant Mariners of World War II
Members of The Lambs Club